Tammer is a surname. Notable people with the surname include:
Christiane Tammer, German mathematician
Erik Tammer (born 1969), Dutch football player
Harald Tammer (1899–1942), Estonian weightlifter, athlete and journalist
Peter Tammer (born 1943), Australian film director

See also
Hotel Tammer, hotel in Tampere, Finland